Hilario a Jesu Costa, O.A.D. (1696–1754) was a Roman Catholic prelate who served as Apostolic Vicar of Eastern Tonking (1737–1754) and Titular Bishop of Corycus (1735–1737).

Biography
Hilario a Jesu Costa was born in Pessinetto, Italy on 2 Sep 1696 and ordained a priest in the Ordo Augustiniensium Discalceatorum.
On 3 Oct 1735, he was appointed during the papacy of Pope Clement XII as Coadjutor Apostolic Vicar of Eastern Tonking and Titular Bishop of Corycus.
On 11 Nov 1736, he was consecrated bishop by Thomas Bottaro, Titular Bishop of Nyssa. 
On 3 Oct 1735, he succeeded to the bishopric.
He served as Apostolic Vicar of Eastern Tonking until his death on 31 Mar 1754.

While bishop, he was the principal consecrator of Louis Néez, Apostolic Vicar of Western Tonking and Titular Bishop of Comana Armeniae (1739).

References 

18th-century Roman Catholic bishops in Vietnam
Bishops appointed by Pope Clement XII
1696 births
1754 deaths
People from the Province of Turin
Discalced Augustinian bishops
18th-century Roman Catholic titular bishops